Starline may refer to:

Transport
 Starline.kz, a defunct Kazakhstan airline
 "STARLINE", the callsign for the United Arab Emirates airline Red Star, see List of airline codes
 "STARLINE", the callsign of the defunct Swedish airline Swedline Express
 Starline, an interterminal train at the Incheon International Airport
 Starline, a light rail train in Malaysia operated by Prasarana Malaysia
 Starline, a cruiseline analog type of company involving space tourism
 Starline Corporation, a bus company in the Philippines, see List of bus companies of the Philippines

Entertainment
 Starline (song), a 2002 rock song by the Japanese band Supercar off the album Highvision
 Starline Drive-In, a drive-in theatre in Australia
 Starline, a brand of toy miniatures built by Amarillo Design Bureau
 Starline Entertainment, a subsidiary of Cube Entertainment
 Starline, a science fiction interstellar travel analog for airline
 Doctor Starline, a fictional character from Sonic the Hedgehog (IDW Publishing)

Other uses
 spectral line, the lines found in the spectrum of stars
 Starline, an elementary school in the Lake Havasu Unified School District
 Starline, a brand of ammunition, see List of handgun cartridges
 Project Starline, an experimental video communication method by Google

See also

 
 
 
 
 Spaceline (disambiguation)
 Starliner (disambiguation)
 Star (disambiguation)
 Line (disambiguation)